The 2016 Barbados Premier Division (officially the Digicel Premier League for sponsorship reasons) is the 70th season of the highest tier of football in Barbados. UWI Blackbirds won their first league title, holding off defending champions BDF by a single point. Pinelands United were winless and are joined by Empire Club in being relegated to Barbados First Division for the 2017 season.

Changes from 2015
 Pride of Gall Hill and Silver Sands were relegated to the Barbados First Division.
 Belfield and Empire Club were promoted to the Premier Division.

Table

Results

Statistics

Top scorers

Hat-tricks

4 Player scored 4 goals.

10 Player scored 10 goals.

References

2011
Barb
Barb
football